Centaury is a common name for several plants and may refer to:

Centaurea, a genus in the Asteraceae containing species sometimes called centaury
Centaurium, a genus in the Gentianaceae containing species commonly called centaury
Gyrandra, a genus formerly included in Centaurium, with species commonly called centaury
Schenkia, a genus formerly included in Centaurium, with species commonly called centaury
Zeltnera, a New World genus formerly included in Centaurium, with species commonly called centaury
Cheirolophus crassifolius, a species in the Asteraceae commonly known as Maltese centaury
Sabatia, a New World genus in the Gentianaceae containing species sometimes called centaury